Isaiah Parente (born March 16, 2000) is an American professional soccer player who plays as a midfielder for Major League Soccer club Columbus Crew.

Career

Youth career
Parente was part of the Columbus Crew academy between 2015 and 2018, making a total of 68 appearances and scoring 15 goals.

College & Amateur
In 2018, Parente went to play college soccer at Wake Forest University, choosing Wake Forest over Duke, Clemson, Akron, Ohio State and Pitt. During his time with the Demon Deacons, Parente made 50 appearances, scoring 3 goals and tallying 19 assists.

During 2019, Parente also appeared for USL League Two side Flint City Bucks, who went on to win the league championship.

Professional career
Parente was announced as a homegrown player signing by Columbus Crew on January 11, 2021.

Parente made his professional debut on April 8, 2021, appearing as a 77th-minute substitute during a 4–0 win against Real Estelí in the round of 16 of the CONCACAF Champions League.

Career statistics

Honors 
Flint City Bucks
USL League Two: 2019

Columbus Crew
Campeones Cup: 2021

Columbus Crew 2
MLS Next Pro: 2022

Individual
MLS Next Pro Best XI: 2022

References

External links 
 Isaiah Parente at Wake Forest Athletics
 Isaiah Parente at Soccerway

2000 births
American soccer players
Association football midfielders
Columbus Crew players
Columbus Crew 2 players
Flint City Bucks players
Homegrown Players (MLS)
Living people
Major League Soccer players
MLS Next Pro players
People from Medina, Ohio
Soccer players from Ohio
USL League Two players
Wake Forest Demon Deacons men's soccer players